Hans-Joachim Böhmer (1 October 1940 – 28 December 1999) was an East German rower who won a bronze medal in the double sculls at the 1972 Summer Olympics, together with Uli Schmied. They also won a European title in 1971 and a silver medal at the 1970 World Rowing Championships. In other rowing events Böhmer won a bronze medal in the eights at the 1966 World Rowing Championships.

On  retiring  from  sport  Böhmer studied political  science, and became a criminologist for the police in the Köpenick district of former East Berlin. His wife Irmgard Brendenal-Böhmer was also European champion in rowing.

References 

Olympic rowers of East Germany
Rowers at the 1972 Summer Olympics
1940 births
1999 deaths
Olympic medalists in rowing
East German male rowers
World Rowing Championships medalists for East Germany
Medalists at the 1972 Summer Olympics
Olympic bronze medalists for East Germany
European Rowing Championships medalists